Roaring Run Furnace is a historic iron furnace located in Jefferson National Forest near Eagle Rock, Botetourt County, Virginia. It was built about 1832, and reflects the national and statewide economics of the iron industry during the 19th century.

It was listed on the National Register of Historic Places in 1983.

The furnace is on the northeastern corner of the Hoop hole wild area.

References

Industrial buildings and structures on the National Register of Historic Places in Virginia
Industrial buildings completed in 1832
Buildings and structures in Botetourt County, Virginia
National Register of Historic Places in Botetourt County, Virginia
George Washington and Jefferson National Forests
Ironworks in Virginia
Industrial furnaces
Foundries in the United States